The Comas were an indie rock band active from 1998 to 2008. They formed in Chapel Hill, NC, in March 1998 as a 'joke country band', a sort of counterweight to the hyped No Depression movement. Before long, however, both the "joke" and the "country" parts of the concept were eliminated, thus allowing the band to develop into a quirky alternative rock outfit. The Comas' respectable 1999 debut, Wave to Make Friends, was composed of sleepy (but not lethargic) indie pop and off-kilter boy-and-girl vocal harmonies, courtesy of co-founders Andrew Herod and Nicole Gehweiler. The band's instrumental canvas proved to be larger and more eclectic than that of the typical indie group, buoying the usual guitars and rhythm section with violin, organ, and creative non-rap samples. Faced with the challenge of labeling such music, the Comas' label billed deemed the sound "stoner pop."

In 2008, lead singer Andy Herod moved to Asheville, and formed a new project, called Electric Owls, which was signed to Vagrant Records. Electric Owls has produced two EPs and a full-length record titled 'Ain't Too Bright'. Assisting him in the studio were a few friends and former member Caperton.

Discography

Albums

EPs and Singles

References

External links 
 
Pitchforkmedia review of Conductor
Myspace page
Yahoo Music Interview/Performance

Indie rock musical groups from North Carolina
Musical groups from Chapel Hill-Carrboro, North Carolina
Yep Roc Records artists
Vagrant Records artists